The Catholic University of Pernambuco (Unicap) in Recife, Pernambuco, Brazil, is a Catholic University, private and non-profit, run by the Society of Jesus. It is considered one of the best universities in Brazil, and the best private one in the north and northeast of Brazil.

History
Unicap was founded on September 27, 1951, and recognized by the Federal Government (Decree 30,417) on January 18, 1952. It grew out of the first Catholic school in the region, Manoel da Nóbrega College of Philosophy, Sciences, and Letters, founded by the Jesuits of the northeast region in 1943. In its development, the university faced incorporation and aggregation or creation of Colleges, Institutes, or Schools, to implement in 1974 the university reform law, adopting the model homogeneous ternary Rectory, Centres, and Departments. Unicap today includes an educational complex with 15,000 students from first-degree courses to graduate school. Some 50,000 have graduated.

The Central Library, named for Aloísio M. de Carvalho, SJ, has 15,000 registered users, 400,000 visits per year, and more than 700,000 loans, with on average of 3,500 readers per day. Its 450,000 volumes are indexed on internet. It is the biggest library of a university in the north and northeast region of Brazil.

Programs
In 2010, in its first evaluation by the Ministry of Education, Unicap received a four out of five. Singled out for commendation were "The policy for teaching undergraduate and postgraduate, research, extension," the policy of incentives for graduates (with the payment of grants and agreements for internships), the approval of the trained law course in the examination of the Bar Association of Brazil (more than 60%), 33 Unicap research groups registered with the National Council for Scientific and Technological Development (CNPq), and the program of scholarships for teachers and employees.

Unicap's Student Exchange Program offers one or two semesters in an IES exchange program at the national or international level. This is encouraged by the Association of Universities entrusted to the Society of Jesus in Latin America (AUSJAL), for a beneficial integration of students from Latin American Jesuit higher education institutions. Unicap also receives foreign IES students in exchange.

Courses

Culture collection
Universidade Católica de Pernambuco maintains a microbial culture collection whose strains are qualified using the UCP epithet (for instance Cunninghamella elegans UCP 542).

See also
 List of Jesuit sites

References

External links
 Official website

Educational institutions established in 1951
Universities and colleges in Recife
Catholic universities and colleges in Brazil
1951 establishments in Brazil